Ahmed Shawkiand its variants may refer to:

Ahmed Shawqi (1868–1932), Egyptian pan-Arab poet and dramatist, a pioneer of the modern Egyptian literary movement 
Ahmed Chawki (born 1982), Moroccan pop singer

See also
Shawki